"Curu Mai" is a song written and composed by Fijian singer and songwriter Savuto Vakadewavosa under the direction of producer Isireli Gumatua. The song is based on Lelean Memorial School and the support vocals on this track were recorded by VLY Navoka and the track was produced in 2012. This track was also part of Savuto Vakadewavosa's debut studio album, Ra Sa Cariba, which was released in 2015 under Music Production House Australia and the official remix version of the track mixed by DJ Ritendra and released in 2015.

Track listing

Remix
A remix version featuring DJ Ritendra premiered on 22 June 2015 and the remix was officially released on 6 July 2015 under Lewavesi Production.

Awards

Fiji Performing Rights Association Music Awards

References

External links
 Curu Mai Track On Soundcloud.
 Curu Mai Remix On VEVO.

2012 singles
2012 songs
Savuto Vakadewavosa songs